People’s Tribunal refers to nongovernmental tribunals founded by citizens. It may refer to:

 2017 People's Tribunal on Myanmar; see Shadi Sadr
 China Tribunal, founded in 2019, to examine claims of organ harvesting by the Chinese government from prisoners, majority being Falun Gong practitioners, but also Uyghurs, Tibetans and house Christians
 Indian People's Tribunal, founded in 1993
 International People's Tribunal on Human Rights and Justice in Kashmir, founded 2008
 Iran Tribunal, a non-binding legal tribunal residing in The Hague
 Russell Tribunal, a 1966 tribunal to investigate American military intervention in Vietnam
 Permanent Peoples' Tribunal, a 1979 continuation of the Russell Tribunal

Tribunal founded by a government (but overseen by Allied Commission) that is named as People's Tribunal:
 Romanian People's Tribunals, two post-World War II tribunals: Bucharest People's Tribunal and the Northern Transylvania People's Tribunal

See also
People's Court (disambiguation)

 
Justice